Dietrich Wagner is a retired engineer who suffered damage to his eyes during the 2010 Stuttgart 21 project protests due to the use of water cannons. He was 66 at the time.

Wagner suffered from the damage to his eyelids, a fracturing of a portion of the retinal bone, and damage to the retinas. The injuries resulted in near-complete loss of eyesight.

He was knocked unconscious by the blast and noticed blood running down his face when he woke up. Wagner had six operations on his eyes but remained almost completely blind.

Aftermath
Before his participation in the Stuttgart 21 protests, Wagner had no political involvement since being in university. Pictures showing Wagner injured, with two people assisting him, were published in many German newspapers. During later demonstrations, some protesters put red colour on their faces to symbolize Dietrich Wagner.

Tristana Moore of Time wrote that the photograph of his injury caused "a regional dispute over an unpopular building project instantly transformed into a national issue — and the political repercussions are now reverberating all the way to Berlin." Wagner became a symbol of the protest against the Stuttgart 21 project. The German newspaper Süddeutsche Zeitung wrote that he was the "face of the protest". According to the author Jakob Augstein, the picture had a relevant impact, causing Minister of Baden-Württemberg Stefan Mappus to lose his position.

In 2014 he visited the United Kingdom to ask Theresa May, the Home Secretary, to not authorise usage of water cannons. In an editorial to The Telegraph Wagner opposed the use of water cannons.

References

Living people
Engineers from Stuttgart
German activists
Year of birth missing (living people)